Raphael Utzig (born 8 August  1996) is a Brazilian professional footballer who plays for Gabala as a forward in the Azerbaijan Premier League.

Club career 
On 11 September 2020, Utzig signed a two-year contract with Gabala FK. On 22 June 2022, Gabala announced that they had extended Utzig's contract for an additional year.

Career statistics

Club

References

External links

Living people
1996 births
Association football forwards
Brazilian footballers
Brazilian expatriate footballers
Campeonato Brasileiro Série A players
Campeonato Brasileiro Série B players
Azerbaijan Premier League players
Foz do Iguaçu Futebol Clube players
Ypiranga Futebol Clube players
Paraná Clube players
Cianorte Futebol Clube players
Gabala FC players
Expatriate footballers in Azerbaijan
Brazilian expatriate sportspeople in Azerbaijan
Footballers from Rio de Janeiro (city)